Juha Heinonen (23 July 1960, Toivakka – 30 October 2007) was a Finnish mathematician, known for his research on geometric function theory.

Biography
Heinonen, whose father was a lumberjack and local politician, grew up in a small town in central Finland. He studied mathematics at the University of Jyväskylä and received his doctorate there in 1987 with a thesis on nonlinear potential theory. His thesis advisor was Olli Martio. During the academic year 1987–1988 Heinonen was a visiting researcher at the Deutsche Forschunsgemeinschaft in Bonn and then at the Centre de Recerca Matemática in Barcelona. He first came to the University of Michigan as a visiting graduate student in 1985, and then came back as a three-year postdoctoral assistant professor from 1988 to 1991.  In 1992 he was hired there as a tenure-track assistant professor, and spent the rest of his career there until his death from kidney cancer in 2007.  He was promoted to full professor in 2000. He was the author or coauthor of three books (one of which was published posthumously) and over 60 research articles.

He was a leading contributor to the development of nonsmooth calculus in geometric analysis on metric spaces. His 2007 article Nonsmooth calculus is an important survey of the subject.

In 1992 Heinonen was a Sloan Research Fellow. In 2002 he was an Invited Speaker with talk The branch set of a quasireglar mapping at the International Congress of Mathematicians in Beijing.  In 2004 he was elected a member of the Finnish Academy of Science and Letters.

In 1991 he married the mathematician Karen E. Smith. They had three children.

Selected publications

Articles

Books and monographs
  (originally published by Oxford University Press in 1993)

References

External links
 

1960 births
2007 deaths
Finnish mathematicians
University of Jyväskylä alumni
University of Michigan faculty
University of Michigan alumni
Members of the Finnish Academy of Science and Letters
People from Toivakka